Incredible Crew is an American sketch comedy television series, created by Nick Cannon for Cartoon Network. Cannon created the series in early 2012, and the series aired from January 24 to April 11, 2013, featuring a 22-minute run time.

This was the final live-action show produced by Cartoon Network until 2021, when Family Mash-Up was announced to be in production.

Plot
Incredible Crew is a live-action sketch comedy series from producer and entertainer Nick Cannon. Episodes consist of short-form surreal comedy acts, hidden camera pranks, original music videos, and commercial parodies using non-sequitur humor. Incredible Crew casts six young comedy stars: Shauna Case (American Horror Story), Shameik Moore (Joyful Noise), Tristan Pasterick (guest star, I'm in the Band), Chanelle Peloso (Level Up), Jeremy Shada (Adventure Time), and Brandon Soo Hoo (Supah Ninjas). Nick Cannon serves as executive producer of Incredible Crew along with Michael Goldman and Scott Tomlinson. Cartoon Network Studios produced the series in association with N'Credible Entertainment.

Sketches
According to Michael Goldman and Scott Tomlinson, over 330 sketches were created and carefully selected for each episode.

Cast

Principal cast
 Nick Cannon as Announcer
 Shauna Case as Herself, Various
 Shameik Moore as Himself, Various
 Tristan Pasterick as Himself, Various
 Chanelle Peloso as Herself, Various
 Jeremy Shada as Himself, Various
 Brandon Soo Hoo as Himself, Various

Recurring cast
 Benton Jennings as Krumping High School Principal 
 Rachel O'Meara as Various 
 Justin Tinucci as Justin, Performer 
 Jillian "Jill" Moray as Mother, Teacher
 Stephanie Jackson as Mom 
 Barbara Kerford as Mom 
 Nicholas "Nick" Leland as Various 
 Lawrence "Larry" Morgan as Dad 
 Cassandra Braden as Mrs. Hall 
 Lawrence Mandley as Referee

Episodes

Pilot (2011)

Season 1 (2013)

Reception
Emily Ashby from Common Sense Media gave the show 3 stars and said that "Nick Cannon's mild sketch comedy will entertain kids," and that it "makes the most of clever writing and a well-rounded cast."

Accolades

Music
In conjunction with the show's music, WaterTower Music released two soundtrack albums based on the first season of the show. The first album, Incredible Crew: Music From the Television Show (Vol. 1), was released on March 5, 2013, and the second, Incredible Crew: Music From the Television Show (Vol. 2), was released on April 23, 2013. Both soundtracks were available to download via iTunes. The show's music was composed by Nick Cannon and Kevin Writer.

Track listing for Volume 1

Track listing for Volume 2

Cancellation
On July 29, 2013, the series was cancelled after one season, mostly due to low ratings. Reruns aired on the network until November 23, 2014.

See also
 All That
 The Amanda Show
 So Random!

References

Notes

External links
 

2013 American television series debuts
2013 American television series endings
2010s American musical comedy television series
2010s American sketch comedy television series
2010s American surreal comedy television series
2010s American teen television series
Cartoon Network original programming
Television series by Cartoon Network Studios
English-language television shows
Television series about teenagers